Countess Palatine Helena of Simmern (13 June 1532 – 5 February 1579 at Schwarzenfels Castle in Sinntal ) was the daughter of Count Palatine and Duke John II of Simmern and his wife, Margravine Beatrice of Baden. She was Countess of Hanau-Münzenberg by marriage.

Marriage and issue 
On 22 November 1551, Helena married Count Philip III of Hanau-Münzenberg (1526–1561). Their combined coat of arms can be seen at the main entrance of the Church of St. Mary in Hanau. However, due to environmental factors, the stone has weathered and is in poor condition.

Philip and Helena had five children:
 Philip Louis I (21 November 1553 – 4 February 1580)
 Dorothea (1556 – 1638)
 Reinhard William (28 September 1557 in Hanau – 17 February 1558) he was buried in the choir of the St. Mary's Church in Hanau.
 John Philip (6 November 1559 – 22 April 1560), also buried in the choir of St. Mary's Church in Hanau
 Maria (1562 – 1605), born posthumously, died unmarried.

Widowhood 
After the early death of her husband, she initiated the proceedings before the Supreme Court to establish the guardianship of her son Philip Louis I, who was still a minor. She was not appointed as guardian herself.

Initially, she used Steinau Castle as her widow seat; later she moved to Schwarzenfels Castle, where she died. After her death, her body was transferred to Hanau in a lead coffin, and buried in the Church of St. Mary, next to her husband.

References 
 Reinhard Dietrich: Die Landesverfassung in dem Hanauischen = Hanauer Geschichtsblätter, issue. 34, Hanau, 1996, 
 Reinhard Suchier: Genealogie des Hanauer Grafenhauses; in: Festschrift des Hanauer Geschichtsvereins zu seiner fünfzigjährigen Jubelfeier am 27. August 1894, Hanau, 1894
 Reinhard Suchier: Die Grabmonumente und Särge der in Hanau bestatteten Personen aus den Häusern Hanau und Hessen, in: Programm des Königlichen Gymnasiums zu Hanau, Hanau, 1879, pp. 1–56
 Ernst J. Zimmermann: Hanau Stadt und Land, Hanau, 1919, reprinted in 1978

Footnotes 

Countesses
House of Palatinate-Simmern
House of Hanau
1532 births
1579 deaths
16th-century German people
Daughters of monarchs